Prizren Municipality is a municipality of Kosovo with its seat as the city of Prizren. It has an area of 640 km2, 5.94% of Kosovo, and has 76 settlements in total. Prizren Municipality shares a border with Gjakova, Orahovac, [Mamusha]], Suva Reka, Štrpce, and Dragaš municipalities, as well as Albania and North Macedonia.

History 
The area of Prizren Municipality has been inhabited since prehistoric times. The first mention of modern Prizren was in 1019.

Demographics by settlement

References

External links 
Municipality of PrizrenOfficial Website

Notes

Municipalities of Kosovo